Old Marlton Pike may refer to:
County Route 600 (Burlington County, New Jersey)
County Route 600 (Camden County, New Jersey)

See also
New Jersey Route 70, also known as Marlton Pike, which runs parallel to the above roads